John J. Weinheimer (c. 1896 – December 18, 1951) was an American football player and coach.  He served as the head football coach at New York University from 1944 to 1946, compiling a record of 10–12.  Weinheimer played football and other sports at NYU.  He was awarded a place in NYU's Athletic Hall of Fame for his playing and coaching efforts.  Weinheimer died at the age of 55 on December 18, 1951, of a heart attack at his home in New York City.

Head coaching record

References

Year of birth uncertain
1890s births
1951 deaths
NYU Violets baseball players
NYU Violets football coaches
NYU Violets football players
New York University School of Law alumni